Upleatham is a village in the unitary authority of Redcar and Cleveland and the ceremonial county of North Yorkshire, England. The village was mentioned in the Domesday Book and the name derives from Old English and Old Norse as Upper Slope, in that it was further up the hill than Kirkleatham.

The landowner of the time, the Earl of  Zetland, allowed the mining company to extract the ironstone from underneath the village provided that the area around the church was left undisturbed. This is why the conservation area in the village is just a small selection of buildings clustered around the church. The arrival of the ironstone mine increased the population of the village from 204 in 1841 to 1,007 in 1861.

It has a small grade II listed church, believed by some to be the smallest in England, although Bremilham Church in Wiltshire is actually slightly smaller. The village is located near New Marske, between Saltburn and Guisborough; there are a few rows of houses which are adjacent to Errington Woods.

References

External links

Redcar and Cleveland
Places in the Tees Valley
Villages in North Yorkshire
Guisborough